4 for the Future is an anthology of science fiction novelettes edited by Groff Conklin. It was first published in paperback by Pyramid Books in August 1959; it was reprinted in June 1962. The first British edition, also in paperback, was issued by Consul Books in 1961.

The book collects four novelettes by various science fiction authors. The stories were previously published from 1944-1956 in various science fiction magazines.

Contents
"Enough Rope" (Poul Anderson)
"The Claustrophile" (Theodore Sturgeon)
"The Children's Hour" (Henry Kuttner and C. L. Moore)
"Plus X" (Eric Frank Russell)

Notes

1959 anthologies
Science fiction anthologies
Groff Conklin anthologies
Pyramid Books books